Live at the Village Vanguard is a live album by the George Adams-Don Pullen Quartet recorded in 1983 and released on the Italian Soul Note label.

Reception
The Allmusic review by Dan Warburton said, "Live at the Village Vanguard finds four extraordinary musicians at the peak of their careers... as a document of how one of the great working units of modern jazz sounded live in one of the music's mythical venues, Live at the Village Vanguard needs some beating." The Penguin Guide to Jazz awarded the album 3 stars saying, "The Village Vanguard sets are a bit ramshackle (compare the live version of "Thank You Very Much, Mr Monk" with the one on the deleted City Gates) and much of the interest now lies in hearing how much Adams anticipates what David Murray was going to be doing (sambas, spirituals) at the end of the decade."

Track listing
 "The Necessary Blues (Thank You Very Much, Mr Monk)" (Don Pullen) – 13:15 
 "Solitude" (Duke Ellington, Eddie DeLange, Irving Mills) – 15:00 
 "Intentions" (George Adams) – 13:00 
 "Diane" (Charles Mingus) – 14:30
Recorded at the Village Vanguard in New York City on August 19, 1983.

Personnel
Don Pullen – piano
George Adams – tenor saxophone
Cameron Brown – double bass
Dannie Richmond – drums

References

Black Saint/Soul Note live albums
Don Pullen live albums
George Adams (musician) live albums
1983 live albums
Albums recorded at the Village Vanguard